Brock Whiston (born 19 November 1996) is a British Paralympic swimmer who competes in international level events.

Whiston is a four-time world record holder including beating a seven year old 200 metre individual medley world record by almost five seconds which had been previously held by Jessica Long.

References

External links
 
 

1996 births
Living people
Sportspeople from London
Paralympic swimmers of Great Britain
English female swimmers
Medalists at the World Para Swimming Championships
S8-classified Paralympic swimmers